Henry Leavitt Ellsworth (November 10, 1791 – December 27, 1858) was a Yale-educated attorney who became the first Commissioner of the U.S. Patent Office, where he encouraged innovation by inventors Samuel F.B. Morse and Samuel Colt. Ellsworth also served as the second president of the Aetna Insurance Company, and was a major donor to Yale College, a commissioner to Indian tribes on the western frontier, and the founder of what became the United States Department of Agriculture.

Early life
Ellsworth was born in Windsor, Connecticut, son of Founding Father and Chief Justice Oliver Ellsworth and Abigail Wolcott. Ellsworth graduated from Yale University in 1810, and studied law at Tapping Reeve's Litchfield Law School in 1811. On June 22, 1813, he married Nancy Allen Goodrich (daughter of Congressman, Judge, New Haven Mayor and longtime Secretary of the Yale Corporation Elizur Goodrich and his wife Anne Willard Allen) with whom Ellsworth had three children, including son Henry W. Ellsworth.

Later in life, he had two subsequent wives, Marietta Mariana Bartlett and Catherine Smith. Ellsworth was named in part for his grandmother's family, the Leavitts of Suffield, Connecticut. After studying law under Judge Gould in Litchfield, Connecticut, he settled first at Windsor and then at Hartford, where he remained for a decade.

Travels
In 1811, when he was 19 years old and a freshly minted Yale graduate, Ellsworth undertook the first of several western trips during his lifetime. Ellsworth traveled by horseback to the Connecticut Western Reserve in present-day Ohio to investigate family lands in the region. (Among the eight original purchasers was a family relation, merchant Thaddeus Leavitt of Suffield.) Ellsworth wrote a small, uneven book about his experiences entitled A Tour to New Connecticut in 1811. Ellsworth's mission was straightening out irregularities in land sales by the family agent.

It was an arduous trip. Along the way Ellsworth made note of attractive vistas, rowdy drunks, solicitous innkeepers and his disappointment in places of which he had heard, like Erie. The journey's rigors were relieved by a meeting with his old friend Margaret Dwight, daughter of Yale president Timothy Dwight IV, who was visiting family in present-day Warren, Ohio. "Here too", wrote Ellsworth, "I met with my good old friend Margaret Dwight, we sat down and passed a few hours in social chat." Dwight wrote her own account of her Western Reserve trip, A Journey to Ohio in 1810.

Over twenty years later, in 1832, Ellsworth traveled west again, this time as U.S. Commissioner of Indian Tribes in Arkansas and Oklahoma. President Andrew Jackson appointed Ellsworth one of three commissioners to "study the country, to mark the boundaries, to pacify the warring Indians and, in general to establish order and justice" after Congress's passage of the 1830 Indian Removal Act. Ellsworth travelled to Fort Gibson to investigate the situation. (Some critics blame Ellsworth for being complicit in the subsequent removal of Native Americans to Indian Territory, present-day Oklahoma, particularly since Ellsworth's appointment and subsequent western trip followed the Indian Removal Act, Andrew Jackson's first significant act as President. Other historians note Ellsworth's sympathetic outlook towards the tribes.)

Along the way, Ellsworth made stops in Cincinnati and Louisville, then traveled on to St. Louis, Missouri, where he met with explorer William Clark and saw the recently captured Native American leader Black Hawk, chief of the Sauk and Fox tribe. Leavitt's mission was a complicated one: he was charged with trying to mediate between the conflicting claims of several Indian tribes, who were being forced into an ever-smaller area, in competition with newer immigrants and the interests of the Chouteau family, the powerful St. Louis magnates of the Midwestern fur trade.

Ellsworth was accompanied on the expedition by three companions: author Washington Irving, who recorded his impressions in A Tour on the Prairies; Charles La Trobe, an Englishman, mountaineer and travel writer  who later served in the British diplomatic corps in the West Indies and Australia; and Swiss Count Albert Pourtales.

Washington Irving wrote of Henry Leavitt Ellsworth, "this worthy leader of our little band": "He was a native of one of the towns of Connecticut, a man in whom a course of legal practice and political life had not been able to vitiate an innate simplicity and benevolence of heart. The greater part of his days had been passed in the bosom of his family and the society of deacons, elders, and statesmen, on the peaceful banks of the Connecticut; when suddenly he had been called to mount his steed, shoulder his rifle and mingle among stark hunters, backwoodsmen, and naked savages, on the trackless wilds of the Far West."

Patent Office
In 1835, Ellsworth was elected mayor of Hartford, Connecticut, but had served only a month when he was appointed the first Commissioner of the U.S. Patent Office, an office he held for ten years, from 1835 until 1845. His twin brother William W. Ellsworth was Governor of Connecticut from 1838 to 1842, and served as a U.S. Congressman from Connecticut as well. William Wolcott Ellsworth was married to the daughter of Noah Webster, the publisher of the eponymous dictionaries.

When he arrived at the Patent Office, Ellsworth found one third of the floor-space in his office occupied by over 60 models of inventions; he moved them to a separate room. He also found that no list of patent applicants had ever been drawn up, a deficiency he soon corrected.

Acting as Patent Commissioner, Ellsworth made a decision that profoundly affected the future of Hartford and Connecticut. The young Samuel Colt was struggling to establish a firm to manufacture his new revolver. Ellsworth became interested in Colt's invention, and in 1836 made the decision to issue Colt U.S. Patent No. 138. On the basis of Ellsworth's decision, Colt was able to raise some $200,000 from investors to incorporate the Patent Arms Manufacturing Company of Paterson, New Jersey, the forerunner of the mighty Colt arms manufacturing empire.

In today's world Ellsworth would be described as an early technology adapter. He became so interested, for instance, in a new-fangled invention by Samuel Morse called the telegraph that Ellsworth petitioned Congress for a $30,000 grant to test the possibilities of the technology.

From Ellsworth's exposure to the West and knowledge of inventions, he prophesied late in life that the lands of the West would be cultivated by means of steam plows. This prophecy was introduced in the probate of his will in an attempt to prove that he was of unsound mind.

Ellsworth was proven correct, of course, and his interest in agriculture during his time as Patent Commissioner induced Congress in 1839 to appropriate the first monies for farming, which were used to collect seeds from foreign countries and distribute them through the United States post office, as Ellsworth had urged. By 1845 Ellsworth's patent office was performing the functions of a full-fledged agricultural bureau. For this accomplishment Ellsworth earned the sobriquet "Father of the United States Department of Agriculture."

A comment by Ellsworth about the increased workload at the patent office, taken out of context and embellished, was apparently the source of an urban legend that a patent office official (Charles H. Duell in some versions) claimed that everything which could be invented had already been invented. In his 1843 report to Congress, Ellsworth stated: "The advancement of the arts, from year to year, taxes our credulity and seems to presage the arrival of that period when human improvement must end." The report then lists a record number of patents, implying his comment was intended to be humorous.

Following Ellsworth's stint in the Patent Office, he settled in Lafayette, Indiana, acting as an agent for purchase and settlement of public land, but in 1857 he returned to Connecticut. Ellsworth later served as an early president of the Aetna Insurance Company. He was an early benefactor of Yale College, donating some $700,000 to his alma mater, as well as title to the Ellsworth lands in the former Western Reserve.

Legacy

Ellsworth died, aged 67, on December 27, 1858, in Fair Haven, Connecticut. Following his death, Ellsworth's papers were discovered among the family papers of the Goodrich family. Ellsworth was a Yale classmate of Chauncey Allen Goodrich, whose sister Nancy Henry Leavitt Ellsworth married. The journal of Ellsworth's first trip to New Connecticut came to the Yale University Library as part of the Goodrich Family Collection. The former patent commissioner's papers  today make up the Henry Leavitt Ellsworth Papers at Yale's Sterling Library.
Annie Goodrich Ellsworth, only daughter of Henry Leavitt Ellsworth, married the publisher Roswell Smith, who with his partner Josiah Gilbert Holland founded, in partnership with the publishing house Charles Scribner & Co., Scribner's Monthly and St. Nicholas magazines. Later Smith founded the publishing house The Century Company, and assumed sole ownership of both magazines. He changed the name of  Scribner's Monthly to The Century. His wife, the former Anna G. Ellsworth, dictated the inaugural message on Samuel F. B. Morse's new telegraph system. "What hath God wrought" read the message, suggested by her mother, the wife of Morse's great champion Henry Leavitt Ellsworth. The daughter of Roswell Smith and Anna G. Leavitt married the American artist landscape painter George Inness, Jr.

See also
Patent Office 1877 fire
Patent Office 1836 fire

References

External links

Henry Leavitt Ellsworth, National Agricultural Hall of Fame
Henry Leavitt Ellsworth Papers (MS 196). Manuscripts and Archives, Yale University Library.
500 Farmers Wanted, Advertisement for Land Sale by Henry Leavitt Ellsworth, Lafayette, Indiana, April 29, 1847, Connecticut History Online
Henry Leavitt Ellsworth, of Connecticut, New York Public Library Digital Gallery

Further reading
 A Tour to New Connecticut in 1811: The Narrative of Henry Leavitt Ellsworth, Henry Leavitt Ellsworth, Phillip R. Shriver (ed.), Volume I of the Western Reserve History Studies Series, The Western Reserve Historical Society, Cleveland, 1985
  Washington Irving on the Prairie: Or, A Narrative of a Tour of the Southwest in the Year 1832, Henry Leavitt Ellsworth, (edited by Stanley Thomas Williams and Barbara Damon Simison), American Book Company, 1937
 A Letter on the Cultivation of the Prairies, Hon. H. L. Ellsworth, Published by S. Augustus Mitchell, Philadelphia, 1837
 Improvements in Agriculture, Arts, & C. of the United States, Hon. Henry L. Ellsworth, Greeley & McElrath, New York, 1843

1791 births
1858 deaths
American pioneers
Lafayette, Indiana
Farmers from Connecticut
Leavitt family
Mayors of Hartford, Connecticut
American businesspeople in insurance
People from Windsor, Connecticut
Benefactors of Yale University
Yale University alumni
Litchfield Law School alumni
Connecticut lawyers
United States Department of Agriculture
American travel writers
American male non-fiction writers
United States Superintendents of Patents
United States Commissioners of Patents
19th-century American politicians
19th-century American philanthropists
19th-century American lawyers